Picea koraiensis, the Korean spruce, is a species of spruce. 

It is a medium-sized evergreen tree growing to 30 m tall, and with a trunk diameter of up to 0.8 m. The shoots are orange-brown, glabrous or with scattered pubescence. The leaves are needle-like, 12–22 mm long, rhombic in cross-section, dark bluish-green with conspicuous stomatal lines. The cones are cylindric-conic, 4–8 cm long and 2 cm broad, maturing pale brown 5–7 months after pollination, and have stiff, smoothly rounded scales.

Its population is stable though low, and there are no known protocols that protect it. It is found mostly in the northern Korean Peninsula near the Yalu River, and in Siberia near the Ussuri River. In China it is restricted north-eastern provinces Heilongjiang, Jilin, and Liaoning. It is also believed that it might possibly occur in areas in southern Ussuriland.

It is closely related to Koyama's spruce (Picea koyamae), and treated as synonymous with it by some botanists.

References

External links
Gymnosperm Database: Picea koraiensis

koraiensis
Picea koraiensis
Picea koraiensis
Picea koraiensis
Picea koraiensis
Taxa named by Takenoshin Nakai